
Gmina Wińsko is a rural gmina (administrative district) in Wołów County, Lower Silesian Voivodeship, in south-western Poland.

Neighbouring gminas
Gmina Wińsko is bordered by the gminas of Jemielno, Prusice, Rudna, Ścinawa, Wąsosz, Wołów and Żmigród.

Villages
The gmina contains the 50 villages of Aleksandrowice, Baszyn, Białawy Małe, Białawy Wielkie, Białków, Boraszyce Małe, Boraszyce Wielkie, Brzózka, Budków, Buszkowice Małe, Chwałkowice, Czaplice, Dąbie, Domanice, Głębowice, Gołaszów, Gryżyce, Grzeszyn, Iwno, Jakubikowice, Kleszczowice, Konary, Kozowo, Krzelów, Łazy, Małowice, Młoty, Moczydlnica Klasztorna, Morzyna, Mysłoszów, Naroków, Orzeszków, Piskorzyna, Przyborów, Rajczyn, Rogów Wołowski, Rogówek, Rudawa, Słup, Smogorzów Wielki, Smogorzówek, Staszowice, Stryjno, Trzcinica Wołowska, Turzany, Węglewo, Węgrzce, Wińsko, Wrzeszów and Wyszęcice.

Twin towns – sister cities

Gmina Wińsko is twinned with:
 Meschede, Germany

References

Winsko
Wołów County